Above the Law (also known as Nico: Above the Law, or simply Nico) is a 1988 American crime action film written, produced and directed by Andrew Davis. It marked the film debut of Steven Seagal, and stars Pam Grier, Sharon Stone, Ron Dean and Henry Silva. Seagal plays Nico Toscani, an ex-CIA agent, Aikido specialist and a Chicago policeman who discovers a conspiracy upon investigating the mysterious shipment of military explosives seized from a narcotics dealer. The film originated after a successful screen test, financed by Michael Ovitz, leading to Seagal being offered a contract by Warner Bros. The film was set and filmed on location in Chicago. The film premiered in the United States on April 8, 1988.

Plot
Sergeant Nico Toscani, who traces his roots to Palermo, Sicily, is a detective in the Chicago Police Department's vice squad. At an early age he had become interested in martial arts, and moved to Japan to study them. In 1969, Toscani was recruited to join the CIA by Nelson Fox and was involved in covert operations on the Vietnamese-Cambodian border during the Vietnam War. There, he became disgusted with DCI Kurt Zagon, who tortured prisoners. A stand-off occurred when Toscani tried to stop a torture session, and he left the CIA. Toscani returned to Chicago, joined the police department, and got married.

Toscani and his new partner Detective Delores "Jacks" Jackson are investigating a drug ring, and after busting two of the dealers, including Salvadorian drug lord Tony Salvano, Toscani finds C-4 explosive. Shortly afterward, the men that Toscani and Jackson arrested are released at the request of federal officials, and Toscani is ordered to stand down. Later, the priest of Toscani's parish is killed in an explosion during Mass. Fox calls Toscani and tells him to move his family to a safer location, saying that he is in danger. Under pressure from the feds, Toscani is asked to turn in his badge. He eventually discovers that the dealers he busted are linked to Zagon, who is still with the CIA, and who is being accused of human rights violations by a Central American priest who was being sheltered by Toscani's priest. While Zagon is torturing the priest, Toscani bursts in and a gun battle ensues. Detectives Lukich and Jackson are wounded during the shootout, and Toscani has to flee.

Senator Ernest Harrison is investigating Zagon's group to reveal their covert operations and drug dealing. When Toscani finds out that Zagon killed the priest and is planning to kill Harrison, he goes after Zagon. Toscani confronts Fox, but they are interrupted by Zagon's men. Fox is killed and Toscani is captured. He is held in the kitchen of a hotel during a Harrison campaign rally. Before Zagon can kill Harrison, Toscani breaks free and kills Zagon and all of his remaining men. Afterwards, Toscani meets Harrison, who has been informed of everything.

Harrison promises justice and Toscani says he is now willing to testify about his experiences with Zagon and covert operations in the CIA.

Cast

 Steven Seagal as Sergeant Nicolo "Nico" Toscani
 Pam Grier as Detective Delores "Jacks" Jackson
 Henry Silva as CIA Agent Kurt Zagon
 Ron Dean as Detective Lukich
 Sharon Stone as Sara Toscani
 Gene Barge as Detective Henderson
 Chelcie Ross as CIA Agent Nelson Fox
 Ronnie Barron as CIA Bartender
 Nicholas Kusenko as FBI Agent Neeley
 Gregory Alan Williams as FBI Agent Halloran
 Jack Wallace as Uncle Branca
 Joseph Kosala as Lieutenant Fred Strozah
 Thalmus Rasulala as Deputy Superintendent Crowder
 Joe Greco as Father Joseph Gennaro
 Henry Godinez as Father Tomasino

Production
It has been reported that Seagal was asked to make the film by his former aikido pupil, agent Michael Ovitz, who believed that he could make anyone a movie star. It was set and filmed in Chicago, Illinois, over 60 days between April 27 and June 26, 1987.

Release

Home media
Warner Bros. released the Region 1 DVD in the United States on January 28, 1998. The Region 2 DVD was released in the United Kingdom on April 26, 1999. The Region-free Blu-ray Disc was released on April 7, 2009.

Reception

Box office
The film grossed $18,869,631 in the U.S.

Critical response
Above the Law received mixed reviews. Rotten Tomatoes gives the film an approval rating of 50%, based on reviews from 20 critics, with an average rating of 5.2/10. Audiences polled by CinemaScore gave the film an average grade of "B" on an A+ to F scale.

Roger Ebert of the Chicago Sun-Times stated "It contains 50 percent more plot than it needs, but that allows it room to grow in areas not ordinarily covered in action thrillers." In a negative review, Hal Hinson of The Washington Post criticized it as "woefully short on originality."

Legacy
Above the Law is regarded as the first American film to feature Aikido in fight sequences.

Steven Seagal tweeted plans for Above the Law 2 on August 1, 2016, but the project remains in pre-production.

References

External links

1988 films
1980s crime action films
1988 martial arts films
American crime action films
American martial arts films
American police detective films
1980s English-language films
Fictional portrayals of the Chicago Police Department
Films directed by Andrew Davis
Films scored by David Michael Frank
Films set in 1973
Films set in 1988
Films set in Chicago
Films with screenplays by Ronald Shusett
Films with screenplays by Steven Pressfield
Vietnam War films
Warner Bros. films
1980s American films